Gishigan-e Bala (also Romanized as Gīshīgān-e Bālā; also known as Geshīgān, Geshīgān-e Bālā, Gīshīgān, and Gīshīgān-e ‘Olyā) is a village in Hoseynabad-e Goruh Rural District, Rayen District, Kerman County, Kerman Province, Iran. At the 2006 census, its population was 50, in 18 families.

References 

Populated places in Kerman County